Felix Gerardo Ortiz Torres (born August 5, 1981) and Gabriel Pizarro (born December 10, 1980), known by their stage name Zion & Lennox, are Puerto Rican reggaeton singers, rappers and songwriters. Both artists were born in Carolina, Puerto Rico, were the duo was originated in 2000. They were part of the reggaeton underground scene until 2004, year in which they released their first studio album, Motivando a la Yal, under White Lion Records. The production's success was later influenced by Daddy Yankee's Barrio Fino, which led reggaeton to mainstream audiences. Also the track "Ahora" featuring Angel Doze was included into the video game FIFA Football 2005 soundtrack.

In 2007, the duo decided to have a short hiatus period and they released their respectives studio albums as soloists: The Perfect Melody (Zion) and Los Mero Meros (Lennox). Three years later, they signed in Pina Records and released their second studio album, Los Verdaderos, the same year and also participated on the label's album La Formula in 2012. Four years later, the duo released their third studio album, Motivan2, under their own label, Baby Records, and also Warner Music Latina. Throughout their career, Zion & Lennox explored different music genres, such as reggaeton, hip hop, latin pop, electropop, contemporary R&B and dancehall.

American Society of Composers, Authors and Publishers Awards 

The ASCAP Awards are awarded annually by the American Society of Composers, Authors and Publishers in the United States.

Billboard Latin Music Awards 

The Billboard Latin Music Awards are awarded annually by Billboard magazine in the United States. Zion & Lennox received one award from seven nominations.

Heat Latin Music Awards 

The Heat Latin Music Awards are awarded annually by the cable television channel HTV in Dominican Republic. Zion & Lennox have a pending nomination.

|-
!scope="row"|2017
|Themselves
|Best Urban Artist
|
|}

Latin American Music Awards 

The Latin American Music Awards are awarded annually by the television network Telemundo in the United States. Zion & Lennox received no awards from three nominations.

|-
!scope="row" rowspan="2"|2015
|Themselves
|Favorite Urban Duo or Group
|
|-
|"Pierdo La Cabeza"
|Favorite Urban Song
|
|-
!scope="row"|2016
|Themselves
|Favorite Urban Duo or Group
|
|}

Latin Music Italian Awards 

The Latin Music Italian Awards are presented annually since 2012 in Milan in order to divulge Latin American music in Italy and Europe. Zion & Lennox received no awards from four nominations.

Lo Nuestro Awards 

The Lo Nuestro Awards (Spanish: Premios Lo Nuestro) are awarded annually by the television network Univision in the United States. Zion & Lennox received no awards from two nominations.

Megaton Awards 
The Megaton Awards are presented annually by the SBS Reggaetón Network, composed of the American radio stations "Reggaeton 94.FM", "mega 97.9FM", "El Sol 95.7FM", and "Latino 96.3FM" in the United States. Zion & Lennox received one award from one nomination.

|-
!scope="row"|2005
|Themselves
|Reggaeton Duet or Group Artist of the Year
|
|}

Premios Tu Mundo 

The Premios Tu Mundo (English: Your World Awards) are presented annually by the television network Telemundo in the United States. Zion & Lennox received no awards from one nomination.

|-
!scope="row"|2015
|"Pierdo La Cabeza"
|Party-Starter Song
|
|}

References 

Zion and Lennox